Shuqualak, pronounced "sugar lock", is a town in Noxubee County, Mississippi, United States. As of the 2020 census, the population was 399.  That is down from 501 from the 2010 census. Three locations in Shuqualak, including most of the downtown area, are included on the National Register of Historic Places.

History

A post office was established in 1855, and the town was incorporated in 1859. Shuqualak was a stop on the Mobile and Ohio Railroad, built in the 1850s. Shuqualak is a name derived from the Choctaw language purported to mean "beads".

Geography
Shuqualak is located on U.S. Route 45, midway between Columbus and Meridian.

An auxiliary landing field for Columbus Air Force Base is located south of the town. The name of the auxiliary landing field is Gunshy.

Demographics

2020 census

As of the 2020 United States Census, there were 399 people, 199 households, and 115 families residing in the town.

2000 census
As of the census of 2000, there were 562 people, 214 households, and 148 families residing in the town. The population density was 493.0 people per square mile (190.3/km). There were 249 housing units at an average density of 218.4 per square mile (84.3/km). The racial makeup of the town was 29.72% White, 69.57% African American, and 0.71% from two or more races.

There were 214 households, out of which 36.0% had children under the age of 18 living with them, 38.3% were married couples living together, 28.0% had a female householder with no husband present, and 30.8% were non-families. 30.4% of all households were made up of individuals, and 12.1% had someone living alone who was 65 years of age or older. The average household size was 2.63 and the average family size was 3.32.

In the town, the population was spread out, with 33.1% under the age of 18, 10.5% from 18 to 24, 24.9% from 25 to 44, 19.6% from 45 to 64, and 11.9% who were 65 years of age or older. The median age was 31 years. For every 100 females, there were 89.2 males. For every 100 females age 18 and over, there were 74.9 males.

The median income for a household in the town was $21,875, and the median income for a family was $26,607. Males had a median income of $28,750 versus $22,596 for females. The per capita income for the town was $12,051. About 30.7% of families and 29.2% of the population were below the poverty line, including 28.1% of those under age 18 and 16.7% of those age 65 or over.

Economy
The Shuqualak Lumber Company was founded in 1948 and employs approximately 150. It is one of the largest privately owned, independent producers of southern yellow pine in the southeastern United States.

Education
The Town of Shuqualak is served by the Noxubee County School District. It was the site of the now defunct Shuqualak Female College, a female seminary founded in 1880.

Notable people
 Vincent Dancy – American football coach
 James Z. George – Confederate politician and military officer

References

External links
 Town of Shuqualak

Towns in Noxubee County, Mississippi
Towns in Mississippi
Mississippi placenames of Native American origin